West Beckwith Mountain is a prominent mountain summit in the West Elk Mountains range of the Rocky Mountains of North America.

West Beckwith Mountain is a laccolith, formed when magma intruded into Mancos Shale some 30 million years ago. Since then, erosion has removed the softer, overlying sedimentary rock, exposing the more resistant igneous rock. West Beckwith Mountain is one of over a dozen laccoliths in the West Elk and adjacent Elk Mountains.

Historical names
West Beckwith Peak

See also
East Beckwith Mountain

List of Colorado mountain ranges

References

External links

West Elk Mountains
Mountains of Gunnison County, Colorado
Gunnison National Forest
Mountains of Colorado
North American 3000 m summits
Laccoliths